Shenjiang Road is a station on Line 12 of the Shanghai Metro.

The station will likely be an interchange station with the planned Chongming Line.

Railway stations in Shanghai
Line 12, Shanghai Metro
Shanghai Metro stations in Pudong
Railway stations in China opened in 2013